is a Japanese musician and singer-songwriter. He belongs to the label Unborde, a sublabel of Warner Music Japan. Before 2017 he made music using Vocaloid and other related software under the name .

Life and career 
Keina Suda started playing drums in junior high. He wanted to be a studio musician and went to Kunitachi College of Music, but soon after dropped the drums in favor of the guitar.

Starting in 2013, he began composing Vocaloid music under the name Balloon on Nico Nico Douga. His most famous song as Balloon was titled "Charles" and was covered by several other singers.

In October 2017, he announced he would start as a singer and songwriter under the name of "Keina Suda". In January 2018 he released his first album under the name Keina Suda, titled Quote. In March of the same year, he performed live for the first time at Shibuya WWW.

In January 2019, he released a new EP under the title Teeter through unBORDE.

On 29 August 2019, his EP Porte was released. His song "Moil" was used as the theme in the  Ni no Kuni movie, and his song "Veil" was used as the ending theme in the anime adaptation of Fire Force.

His single "Alba" was the theme song of the 2020 movie Wednesday Disappears.

Discography

Music released as Balloon

Albums

EP

Split album

Music released as Keina Suda

Singles

Albums

EP

References

Japanese musicians
Living people
1993 births